Khatamabad (also Romanized as Khātamābād; also known as Emāmzādeh ‘Abdollāh, Khānābād, and Khānehābād) is a village in Milajerd Rural District, Milajerd District, Komijan County, Markazi Province, Iran. At the 2006 census, its population was 230, in 61 families.

References 

Populated places in Komijan County